The Man Who Could Talk to Kids is a 1973 American made-for-television drama film directed by Donald Wrye. It was originally broadcast on ABC on October 17, 1973.

Plot 
This is the story of one boy isolated in his world, who allows one man to penetrate it, in order to bring the family back together.

Cast
 
Peter Boyle as Charlie Datweiler
Scott Jacoby as Kenny Lassiter
Collin Wilcox Paxton as Honor Lassiter
Tyne Daly as Susie Datweiler
Robert Reed as Tom Lassiter 
Denise Nickerson as Dena Pingitore 
Dudley Knight as Mr. Carling

References

The story was a Docu-drama based on Harold Mondschein's work with troubled kids (Learning, Behavior and Emotional issues.) The young man portrayed in the film was a composite of several children he had previously worked with. It was Peter Boyle's first adventure into trying a different kind of "softer" character, one of Donald Wrye's first forays into directing and one of ABC's first made for television movies, which started a "trend." Douglas Day Stewart began his writing career close to this time and this was one of Tomorrow Entertainments' first production efforts.

External links

1973 drama films
1973 television films
1973 films
Films with screenplays by Douglas Day Stewart
Films directed by Donald Wrye
Films scored by Fred Karlin
ABC Movie of the Week
1970s English-language films